Yayla çorbası ('highland soup'), also known as  ('yogurt soup'), is a Turkish yogurt soup cooked with a variety of herbs (mint, purslane, parsley and others), rice, and (sometimes) chickpeas. Variations of it occur throughout the Middle East.

See also
 Ash-e doogh, a similar Iranian soup
 Tarator
 Toyga soup
 Dovga
 List of soups
 List of yogurt-based dishes and beverages

References

Turkish soups
Turkish vegetarian cuisine
Iraqi cuisine
Iranian soups
Vegetarian dishes of Iran